Caister Volunteer Lifeboat Service, or Caister Lifeboat, is based at Caister-on-Sea in Norfolk, and operates one of only three offshore lifeboats in the UK that are independent of the RNLI. 

A lifeboat at Caister was first documented in 1791, being used by the Caister Beach Company to salvage ships wrecked on the sand banks offshore from Caister. Between 1856 and 1969 lifeboats at Caister were operated by the RNLI. 

The current lifeboats, the Bernard Matthews II (a Dutch-built Valentijn 2000 offshore lifeboat) and the Fred Dyble II (a 7m long Alicat inshore lifeboat), are run by the Caister Volunteer Lifeboat Service, a registered charity supported entirely by public donation.

List of coxswains
1845–1872 Ben Hodds
1872–1887 Philip George
1887–1900 James Haylett Jnr
1900–1901 Aaron Haylett
1902–1903 John "Whampo" Brown
1903–1919 John "Spratt" Haylett
1919–1935 Charles Laycock
1935–1950 Joseph Woodhouse
1950–1956 James Brown
1956–1969 Jack Plummer
1969–1981 Alfred Brown
1981–1991 Roland "Benny" Read
1991–2004 Richard Thurlow
2004–2019 Paul Williams
2019–Present Day Guy Gibson

Sinking of the Zephyr 
At around midnight on 22 July 1885 the Caister lifeboat, the yawl Zephyr, was launched to the aid of a stranded schooner on the Lower Barber Sand. It was a calm and moonlit night and the crew of fifteen were on what they felt was a routine call. The assistant coxswain, James Haylett, Senior, was at the helm and as the yawl neared the Barber he called out "now dear boys, keep a lookout for that old stump" referring to the mast of a stone-laden schooner, the crew of which had been saved by the Caister men some nine years earlier. His warnings came too late however when the yawl’s port bow struck the mast and the boat was ripped apart. 
 
Seconds later the whole crew were struggling in the water. They managed to cut free much of the yawl’s rigging and masts and this proved to be the salvation of the survivors. James Haylett supported himself on two oars before drifting close by the foremast, on which were his son Aaron, William Knowles and Joseph Haylett. They kept afloat for a time, but the mast kept rolling over in the swell. Aaron moved to his father’s oars but William and Joseph were drowned. John George, another of the crew, swam towards the shore and came across a shrimper, The Brothers, of Yarmouth, which then led the search for the other beachmen. First to be picked up was Robert Plummer on a grating, then one after the other, Aaron Haylett, Isaiah Haylett, George Haylett, Harry Russell, and lastly James Haylett, Senior, still on the foremast with an oar under one arm and a sett under the other. The remaining eight crewmen, including Aaron Haylett, were drowned.

1901 Caister lifeboat disaster 

On the night of 13 November 1901 the lifeboat Beauchamp and nine crew were lost while attempting a rescue during heavy seas. Asked at the inquest to their deaths why the crew had persisted in the rescue, retired coxswain James Haylett in response to the question from the coroner "I suppose they had given up the job and were returning." said "They would never give up the ship. If they had to keep at it 'til now, they would have sailed about until daylight to help her. Going back is against the rules when we see distress signals like that." This response was translated by journalists to become the famous phrase "Caister men never turn back"; "Never Turn Back" was later to become a motto of the RNLI. A monument to the men lost in the disaster bearing this inscription stands in the cemetery at Caister and the pub nearest to the lifeboat shed is named the "Never Turn Back".

RNLI and independent status 
The RNLI lifeboat station at Caister was closed by the Institution in October 1969 after the Great Yarmouth and Gorleston lifeboat station received a 44ft Waveney class lifeboat which was deemed fast enough to cover the Caister area. The Caister Lifeboat station re-opened as an independently run lifeboat station dependent on public donation, and continues to save lives today.

Death of coxswain Benny Read
On Sunday, 1 September 1991, coxswain Benny Read was killed after a flare accidentally exploded in his hand, whilst responding to a false alarm.

See also
 Independent lifeboats (British Isles)

References

Further reading
Tooke, C. (August 1986) "Caister - Beach Boats and Beachmen", Poppyland Publishing. 
Pestell, R. (October 1973) "Norfolk Fair Magazine: The saga of the Caister lifeboats", R.F. Eastern Limited.

External links 
 http://www.caister-lifeboat.org.uk/
 BBC Online - Norfolk - Extra - Caister Lifeboat
 Sidmouth Lifeboat, an independent volunteer service in East Devon.
 Freshwater Lifeboat, an independent volunteer service in Freshwater, Isle of Wight
 Song about the Beauchamp Lifeboat Disaster

Lifeboat stations in Norfolk
Organisations based in Norfolk
Sea rescue organisations of the United Kingdom
Independent Lifeboat stations
Caister-on-Sea